Chitgar Park is a forest park situated in western Tehran, Iran. It covers an area of about 14.5 square kilometers, and includes ramps and facilities for cycling and skating. Chitgar Lake is located to the north of this park.

Geography
Chitgar Park is one of the largest parks of Tehran Province, lying within the borders of District 22 of the city of Tehran. The forest areas of the park are irrigated by Kan Creek and Vardavard River.

The park is served by a highway and a metro line. The metro station is also called Chitgar, and is located to the north of Tehran-Karaj Freeway.

References
Adelkhah, Fariba (2004). Being Modern in Iran. New York: Columbia University Press.
(1996). "Tehran leisure park gets go-ahead." Middle East Economic Digest. September 6.

Parks in Tehran
Tourist attractions in Tehran